The Alstom Metropolis C751C is the second generation of communication-based train control (CBTC) electric multiple unit rolling stock in operation on the North East line of Singapore's Mass Rapid Transit (MRT) system. 18 trainsets of 6 cars were manufactured by Shanghai Alstom Transport Co Ltd (joint venture of Alstom and Shanghai Electric), Deliveries began in July 2014. All 18 trainsets were delivered by 2015.

Tender 
The tender for trains under the contract 751C was opened together with another contract C830C for an additional 24 Circle line trains which was closed on 18 July 2011 with 4 bids. The Land Transport Authority has shortlisted all of them and the tender results was published on 1 February 2012.

Design

Externally, the C751C shares similarities with its predecessor, the C751A in terms of shape, color and appearance, but has an additional window on the detrainment doors located at the ends of the train, allowing passengers to see the tracks ahead. The detrainment system on a C751C is also different than that of a C751A. The interior of the C751C is similar to the C751A but has redesigned gangways identical to those on the C830C. The seat colours are similar to the C951(A) and C801A, having a purplish tint. Priority seats can be identified by their red colouration. The C751C has a dynamic route-map system, similar to the C830C and C951. It also has a louder and higher-pitched traction motor than its predecessor, and is equipped with a new type of pantograph.

The C751C trains utilise overhead line gearboxes installed by Brecknell Willis and they do not have any LCD Displays. Compared to the C751A trains, the interior roof is white instead of beige-orange.

Features

It features a Visual Passenger Information System, letting commuters know what the current and next station is, as well as green blinking lights which indicate the side of which the train doors will open when the train reaches the station.

There is also a dynamic in-train route display, which provides commuters with their route information throughout their journey, and also indicates which side the doors will open. DRMD panels are installed in these trains, which will be slightly modified in 2024 to include Punggol Coast on the North East line extension.

At most stations on the North East line, the train doors will open on the right side, but at the terminal stations like HarbourFront and Punggol, some trains may open their doors on the left.

Driverless operation
The C751C is fully driverless under normal circumstances, using CBTC which do not require traditional "fixed-block track circuits" for determining train position. Instead, they rely on "continuous two-way digital communication" between each controlled train and a wayside control center, which may control an area of a railroad line, a complete line, or a group of lines. Recent studies consistently show that CBTC systems reduce life-cycle costs for the overall rail property and enhance operational flexibility and control.

Train Formation
The configuration of a C751C in revenue service is DT–Mp–Mi+Mi–Mp–DT

The car numbers of the trains range from 7x051 to 7x086, where x depends on the carriage type. Individual cars are assigned a five-digit serial number by the rail operator SBS Transit. A complete six-car trainset consists of an identical twin set of one driving trailer (DT) and two motor cars (Mi & Mp) permanently coupled together. For example, set 7061/7062 consists of carriages 71061, 72061, 73061, 73062, 72062 and 71062.

The first digit is always a 7.
The second digit identifies the car number, where the first car has a 1, the second has a 2 & the third has a 3.
The third digit is always a 0.
The fourth digit and fifth digit are the train identification numbers. A full-length train of 6 cars have 2 different identification numbers. For example, 7051/7052 (normal coupling) or 7051/7062 (cross coupling).
 Alstom built sets 7051/7052-7085/7086.

References

External links

Mass Rapid Transit (Singapore) rolling stock
Alstom multiple units
Train-related introductions in 2015
1500 V DC multiple units